Sherab may refer to:

Chetsun Sherab Jungnay, eleventh century Tibetan Abbot and scholar who founded the Shalu Monastery south of Shigatse, Tibet
Dolpopa Sherab Gyaltsen (1292–1361), Tibetan Buddhist master known as "The Buddha from Dolpo"
Khenchen Palden Sherab, scholar and lama in the Nyingma school of Tibetan Buddhism
Khenpo Sherab Sangpo, trained by Khenpo Petse Rinpoche and Jigme Phuntsok Rinpoche, two of the greatest masters of the Nyingma tradition in recent history
Kunzang Sherab (born 1636), head of Palyul Namgyal Chanchub Choling
Ngok Loden Sherab (1059–1109), important in the transmission of Buddhism from India to Tibet
Sherab Gyeltshen (born c. 1955), a Bhutanese politician and the incumbent Minister for Home and Cultural Affairs
Sherab Lhamo, a leading Bhutanese actress
Sherab Palden Beru (1911–2012), celebrated exiled Tibetan thangka artist who has played a key role in preserving the art-form